Heinz Schweizer (18 July 1908 Berlin – 5 June 1946 Biesenthal) was a German officer in the Luftwaffe of the Wehrmacht, last in the rank of Hauptmann. From about 1940, Schweizer belonged to a house demolition and bomb disposal command (Sprengkommando) in Düsseldorf-Kalkum. For his work, Schweizer was stylized by the Nazis as the hero of bomb disposal saving life and described by the propaganda press as a "man with nerves of steel", but near the end of World War II, he saved around 100 to 150 political prisoners in forced labour from certain death interned at a detention subcamp near Düsseldorf.

Background

From Schweizer's youth in Berlin, not much is known. In the 1930s he became an officer in the Reichswehr, later in the Luftwaffe, which was newly founded in 1935, and in 1936, he volunteered for service in the Spanish Civil War with the Condor Legion. Around 1940, Schweizer came to Düsseldorf-Kalkum as a specialist in explosives and was in charge of a demolition and bomb clearance command (Sprengkommando) for the north of Düsseldorf and adjacent areas. Here he was responsible for defusing and removing unexploded ordnance with his comrades after air raids. From 1942 this command was reinforced by prison inmates, who were primarily political prisoners, and from 1943, initially by around 50 forced labourers from the Buchenwald concentration camp. In this life-threatening work, those involved regularly died.

During World War II, the German bomb disposal command was a Luftwaffe unit, made up of highly skilled  (in English: explosive ordnance technicians), who were given specific and extensive training in bomb disposal, although by the late-war period this was replaced by experience and examination alone, as for the British system. A demolition and bomb clearance command or Sprengkommando was led by an officer or Oberfeuerwerker (Senior NCO) with three or four Feuerwerker. Simple labouring, such as excavation for buried bombs after air raids, was carried out by prisoners in forced labour: either common criminals or political prisoners, but not prisoners of war (POWs). Citizens of occupied countries were also used, within those countries. These prisoner labourers were in turn guarded by Luftwaffe guards. Relations between Luftwaffe personnel and prisoners appear to have been cordial, for the political prisoners at least, if not the common criminals.

The RAF Dambusters bouncing bomb
In May 1943, Schweizer recovered the unexploded bouncing bomb code-named 'Upkeep', carried by RAF Lancaster bomber ED927 AJ-E 'Easy Elsie', which crashed just outside the village of Haldern, near the German-Dutch border on route to its target the Sorpe Dam, on 16 May in Operation Chastise, the Dambusters Raid; the bomb was thrown clear of the crash but did not detonate.

Knight's Cross award
A month later, on 28 June 1943, Schweizer received the Knight's Cross of the Iron Cross for defusing numerous bombs and for his work developing new defusing methods of unexploded ordnance or delay-action bombs; some of these methods are still used today by bomb disposal units in Germany, when they have to render discovered World War II bombs harmless. Schweizer became the first non-flying Luftwaffe officer (Hauptmann (W)) to be awarded the Knight's Cross of the Iron Cross and was transferred to a research centre as a kind of promotion. Schweizer became stylized by the Nazis as the hero of bomb disposal saving life and described by the propaganda press as a "man with nerves of steel". Schweizer promptly seized a break from the wheels of the Nazi propaganda machine, and returned a short time later to head the demolition and bomb clearance command Sprengkommando 1/IV Ratingen-Düsseldorf stationed in Düsseldorf-Kalkum, where researchers believe Schweizer began to increasingly distance himself from Nazism. Schweizer is noted for his later role in saving a group of political prisoners from execution near the end of the War.

Role in saving political prisoners
In 1945, Schweizer learned that "The SS, Gestapo and other authorities ordered the killing of political prisoners so that they would not fall into enemy hands." In March 1945, Schweizer was supposed to send about 100 forced labourers involved in an evacuation back to their penitentiary subcamp in Lüttringhausen, which would have meant their certain death, since 60 other prisoners were murdered there during the final phase of the Nazi war crimes. Schweizer refused this order and, together with his junior assistant Oberleutnant Werdelmann, under the pretext of needing more personnel, claiming that a number of unexploded bombs required an immediate large team of labourers, even ordered 50 more forced labourers to be released in his custody, with whom he surrendered to the United States Army a short time later in Bergisches Land.

After the War and death
Based on statements by former prisoners and forced labourers, Schweizer was released from captivity in July 1945, and despite warning returned to his family in Biesenthal near Eberswalde in the Soviet-occupied zone of the Allied-occupied Germany. In June 1946, Schweizer was fatally shot in Biesenthal by an alcohol-intoxicated Soviet Army soldier. The exact circumstances of his death are not known.

Notes

References 

Bibliography

 
 
 Thamm, August (2004). Hauptmann (W) und Ritterkreuzträger Heinz Schweizer—Feuerwerker und Sprengkommandoführer (in German). Biblio-Verlag. .

1908 births
1946 deaths
Military personnel from Berlin
Recipients of the Knight's Cross of the Iron Cross
Luftwaffe personnel of World War II
People murdered in Germany
Bomb disposal personnel
German murder victims
German people executed by the Soviet Union
Deaths by firearm in Germany
German military personnel of the Spanish Civil War